To Each His Life (Spanish:Cada quién su vida) is a 1960 Mexican drama film directed by Julio Bracho and starring Ana Luisa Peluffo, Emma Fink and Carlos Navarro. A collection of prostitutes and others disappointed in life gather in a Mexico City cabaret to celebrate New Year's Eve.

The film's sets were designed by the art director Salvador Lozano Mena.

Cast

References

Bibliography 
 Goble, Alan. The Complete Index to Literary Sources in Film. Walter de Gruyter, 1999.

External links 
 

1960 films
1960 drama films
Mexican drama films
1960s Spanish-language films
Films directed by Julio Bracho
Films set in Mexico City
1960s Mexican films